State Trunk Highway 100 (STH-100, commonly known as Highway 100 or WIS 100) is a road which encircles the outer edges of Milwaukee County, Wisconsin, United States.

Route description
The road is designed as a bypass around the city of Milwaukee, but with residential and commercial development along WIS 100 on almost all portions of the road, this purpose has been negated, and it serves as one of the Milwaukee area's major commercial corridors. WIS 100 roughly parallels the freight railroad beltway around Milwaukee constructed in 1912 by the Chicago and North Western Transportation Company, approximately one mile inside the north, west and south county lines.

In Milwaukee's immediate western suburb Wauwatosa, WIS 100's north–south segment was once known as Lovers Lane; parts of the road still have this designation.  In the vicinity of Mayfair Shopping Center, it is known as Mayfair Road; this corresponds to 108th street in Milwaukee's numbered roadways scheme.

The roadway served the Muirdale Tuberculosis Sanatorium and County Airfield and Limestone Quarry at what is now Currie Park. In the late 1950s, due to the combination of ready roadway and rail access, the area experienced an employment boom as several large cold storage warehouses and food-related truck terminals were constructed nearby. With the development of Mayfair in 1958 by malting scion Kurtis Froedtert, the name was changed to Mayfair Road. 

One of the few vestiges of this earlier era is the roadway's popularity as a cruising strip for mainly young motorists showing off their vehicles. West Allis and Milwaukee eventually cooperated to attempt to outlaw cruising on the road as a violation of unlawful assembly statutes, which result in the fining of drivers and impoundment of their vehicles. Signs are posted along the road to remind motorists of the law, including in West Allis, where the threshold is the passing of a controlled point more than three times in a certain period.

History
Between 1920 and 1923, WIS 100 was designated via parts of modern-day WIS 138 and US 51. The entirety was replaced by a new alignment of WIS 10.

The current alignment of WIS 100 was initially a county-constructed concrete loop highway known as County Trunk Highway L. WIS 100 was then assigned in 1923 along part of the county highway as well as WIS 15 (now superseded by US 41) and WIS 74.

Major intersections

See also

References

External links

 WIS 100 Terminus Photos
 

100
Transportation in Milwaukee County, Wisconsin
Transportation in Waukesha County, Wisconsin